The following article details the pedestrian underpasses of Makati, all of which are in the city's Central Business District (CBD). The underpasses are part of Makati's pedestrian walkway network which consist of underpasses, covered sidewalks, and elevated walkways.

Background
Makati's underpasses were developed jointly by the Ayala Land, and its estate association, Makati Commercial Estates Association (MCEA). The first of these underpasses was the one in Legazpi Street, built in 1995. This was a response to the heavy traffic congestion in the 1990s.

The underpasses are also noted for its murals in its interiors.

Summary

References

Pedestrian infrastructure in the Philippines
Pedestrian tunnels in the Philippines
Buildings and structures in Makati
Transportation in Metro Manila
Makati Central Business District